Zhang Xinguang (born 1965) is a retired male badminton player from China.

Career
He won the bronze medal at the 1985 IBF World Championships in the mixed doubles with Lao Yujing. He also won the men's doubles at the 1984 Polish Open with  Wang Jian.

References

1965 births
Living people
Chinese male badminton players
Badminton players from Guangzhou